Thomas Pettit may refer to:

 Thomas Pettit (mayor) (1858–1934), mayor of Nelson, New Zealand
 Thomas M. Pettit (1797–1853), politician and judge from Pennsylvania
 Thomas S. Pettit (1843–1931), newspaper publisher and politician from Kentucky
 Tom Pettit (1931–1995), NBC news correspondent
 Tom Pettit (footballer) (1885–1970), Australian rules footballer

See also
Tom Pettitt (1859–1946), American real tennis player
Pettit (surname)